Kyrgyzstan competed at the 1998 Winter Olympics in Nagano, Japan. Biathlete Aleksandr Tropnikov was the only competitor for the Asian nation at these Olympics.

Biathlon

Men

 1 A penalty loop of 150 meters had to be skied per missed target.
 2 One minute added per missed target.

References 
 Official Olympic Reports
 Olympic Winter Games 1998, full results by sports-reference.com

Nations at the 1998 Winter Olympics
1998
1998 in Kyrgyzstani sport